Píritu Municipality may refer to the following places in Venezuela:

Píritu Municipality, Anzoátegui
Píritu Municipality, Falcón, see Falcón State

Municipality name disambiguation pages